Lancing Old Boys is an amateur association football club, based in Tolworth, for the former pupils of Lancing College.

History

The club was founded in 1877, the college's most notable former footballing pupil being Charles Wollaston, who had previously won the FA Cup with the Wanderers five times, and who later played for the Old Boys.  Jarvis Kenrick, scorer of the first-ever goal in the FA Cup and also a Cup winner, was also an old boy.

The club entered the FA Cup for the first time in 1885-86, beating Barnes 7-1 away in the first round, scoring five times in the second half.  The club lost 6-1 to Brentwood in the second round; Bates, the goalkeeper for the original tie, was playing as a back in the second round, and, after the third goal went in, was swapped around with the replacement goalkeeper Brown, to no avail.

The club did not enter the following year, perhaps recognizing that the side was weaker than in previous years (in a friendly, the club lost 12-0 to the Swifts) but returned in 1887-88, losing 4-2 in the first round to the Old Etonians.

With the advance of professional football, the club's last FA Cup entry was in 1889-90, losing to Old St Mark's in the second qualifying round.  The club retreated to the old boy competitions, and has had considerable success in the Arthurian League and the Arthur Dunn Cup, particularly in the 1980s, when they won the League and Cup double in three consecutive years.

Honours

Arthurian League

Winners: 1965-66, 1982-83, 1983-84, 1984-85, 1990-91, 1993-94

Arthur Dunn Cup

Winners: 1982-83, 1983-84, 1984-85, 1992-93, 1995-96, 1999-2000
Runners-up: 1979-80, 1998-99, 2014-15

Notable players

Three players were capped by England while with the club:

Henry Hammond
Edward Haygarth
Charles Wollaston

References

Football clubs in England
People educated at Lancing College
Association football clubs established in 1877
Amateur association football teams
1877 establishments in England